Autumn Sonata is a 1978 drama film written and directed by Ingmar Bergman, and starring Ingrid Bergman (in her final film role), Liv Ullmann and Lena Nyman. Its plot follows a celebrated classical pianist and her neglected daughter who meet for the first time in years, and chronicles their painful discussions of how they have hurt each other. It was the first and only collaboration by Ingrid Bergman and Ingmar Bergman, whose names may be similar but are not related.

Autumn Sonata was the last of Ingmar Bergman's films to be made for theatrical exhibition; all of his films made after it, even those screened in theatres, were television productions.

Plot
Eva (Liv Ullmann), wife of the village pastor, invites her mother Charlotte (Ingrid Bergman) for a visit to her village. She has not seen her for over seven years. Her mother is a world-renowned pianist, somewhat eccentric, aging, and has survived several husbands. Eva is not as talented as the mother (despite the fact that she has written two books and plays the piano passably). Eva's main concern is to be the mistress of her home, wife, mother, and loving sister. It is gradually learned through her dialogue with her mother that her life has had a large number of unfortunate setbacks: a husband Viktor (Halvar Björk) she respects, but does not really have affection for, their son Erik who drowned when only 4 years old, and Charlotte never appears to have loved Eva as a mother normally loves a daughter. As part of her day-to-day life, Eva takes care of her disabled and paralyzed sister Helena (Lena Nyman), whom she has taken out of the hospital into her own home. She appears to be the only person who can understand her sister's limited speech ability.

The presence of Helena in Eva's house is shocking to the aging mother. She makes a gift of her own wrist watch to Helena, and listens to Eva playing Prelude No. 2 in A minor by Chopin. She immediately re-performs the same prelude after Eva finishes in her own preferred interpretation of the music. Before going to bed, Charlotte decides to make a gift of her own car to her daughter. She plans to take a flight home, and buy a new car for herself, as a measure of her altruism. At night, Charlotte wakes up from a nightmare: it seems that Eva is choking her. She gets up, goes into the living room followed by Eva, who had heard her mother screaming from the nightmare.

Mother and daughter begin an impassioned rediscovery and clarification of their past relationship. Eva's husband overhears this unexpectedly heightened exchange, but wisely decides not to participate and interfere. Hearing this impassioned exchange, her disabled younger sister painfully forces herself out of her bed and starts crawling up to the stairs to where Eva and Charlotte are arguing. Upon reaching the landing she starts shouting, "Mama, come!"

In the morning Charlotte prepares for her departure. Eva goes to the grave of her departed son, and her husband ineffectively tries to soothe her ailing sister. Charlotte asks for a friend to escort her away by train. While speaking to her agent Paul on the train, she begins to question the unfortunate fate of her disabled and paralyzed daughter, asking the unanswerable question: "Why couldn't she die?" Her older daughter sends her mother a letter starting with: "I realize that I wronged you." The mother apparently reads the letter that concludes by leaving open the possibility of a future reconciliation, though the closing shot is of Viktor putting the letter in the envelope, leaving the possibility that he, or Eva, merely envisioned Charlotte reading the letter.

Cast

Production
Due to his battle with the Swedish tax authorities at the time, Ingmar Bergman produced Autumn Sonata through his West German company, Personafilm GmbH, with main financing from Lew Grade's British ITC Film, and shot the film in an old film studio outside Oslo in Norway. Although formally a German production (with the German title, Herbstsonate, being the official original title), the dialogue is in Swedish, most of the crew and actors were Swedish, and the world premiere was in Stockholm.

Peter Cowie in the notes to the Criterion DVD edition of the film summarizes the production, stating: "Shot in Norway, with British and American backing, and featuring Swedish dialogue, Autumn Sonata emerged from one of the darkest spells in Ingmar Bergman’s life. In 1976 he had gone into voluntary exile in Munich after being accused of evading tax on the income from certain films... Autumn Sonata... marks the swan song of Ingrid Bergman’s career, fulfilled her long-held desire to make a film with her namesake."

Soundtrack
The piano piece in the film is Frédéric Chopin's Prelude No. 2 in A minor played by Käbi Laretei, whose hands are shown whenever Ingrid Bergman is depicted playing the piano.

Reception
In the Chicago Reader, Dave Kehr opined that Autumn Sonata "makes good chamber music: it's a crafted miniature with Bergman's usual bombast built, for once, into the plot requirements." Conversely, Gary Arnold of The Washington Post felt that its story was "a dubious variation on familiar neurotic themes" in Bergman's work, but also wrote that "one can be impressed by Bergman's instrumentalists while rejecting his composition. ... Autumn Sonata enjoys instant status as an acting showcase." Film critic Roger Ebert ranked the film at No. 5 in his list of 10 Best Films of 1978.

Retrospective evaluation is favorable. In 2002, Keith Phipps of The A.V. Club wrote, "When it was released in 1978, Ingmar Bergman's Autumn Sonata received positive to indifferent reviews, written off by many as a minor work from a great director. ... With the burden of high expectations lifted, Autumn Sonata can finally be seen as an austerely beautiful meditation on death and the not-always-realized possibility of reconciliation across generations." The film has an 87% rating on Rotten Tomatoes from 30 reviews with the consensus: "A melancholy meditation on the unresolvable tension between parent and child, Autumn Sonata is a fitting swan song for the great Ingrid Bergman."

Accolades

Remakes and stage adaptations
 Tehzeeb (2003) is a Hindi film inspired by Autumn Sonata.
 In September 2008 a theatrical version entitled Sonata de otoño was performed in Madrid.
 A stage adaptation was performed at the Royal Dramatic Theatre in Stockholm in 2009 with Marie Göranzon and Maria Bonnevie.
 In April 2011, a new theatrical adaptation of Autumn Sonata, based on Bergman's original screenplay, had its World Premiere at the Yale Repertory Theatre in New Haven, CT, directed by Robert Woodruff.
 In 2017, a Swedish-language opera, Höstsonaten, was premièred at the Finnish National Opera.

Notes

References

External links
 
 
 
 

1978 films
1978 drama films
Best Foreign Language Film Golden Globe winners
Films about abortion
Films about classical music and musicians
Films about dysfunctional families
Films about parenting
Films about widowhood
Films adapted into operas
Films directed by Ingmar Bergman
Films set in Sweden
Films shot in Norway
Films with screenplays by Ingmar Bergman
ITC Entertainment films
Swedish drama films
1970s Swedish-language films
Films about mother–daughter relationships
1970s Swedish films